María del Carmen Bellón (born 25 May 1964) is a Spanish judoka. She competed in the women's middleweight event at the 1992 Summer Olympics.

References

1964 births
Living people
Spanish female judoka
Olympic judoka of Spain
Judoka at the 1992 Summer Olympics
People from Linares